Elizabeth is a Statutory Town that is the most populous municipality in Elbert County, Colorado, United States. The town population was 1,675 at the 2020 United States Census, a +23.34% increase since the 2010 United States Census. Elizabeth is a part of the Denver–Aurora–Lakewood, CO Metropolitan Statistical Area and the Front Range Urban Corridor.

History

Elizabeth, initially called Russellville, was originally a saw mill camp. The town was later named after a family member of John Evans, a territorial governor.

The town has had a post office since 1882 and was incorporated in October 1890.

Geography
Elizabeth is located in western Elbert County at  (39.359954, -104.600063). Colorado State Highway 86 passes through the town, leading east  to Kiowa and west  to Castle Rock.

Demographics

As of the census of 2000, there were 1,434 people, 496 households, and 380 families residing in the town. The racial makeup of the town was 94.00% White, 0.07% African American, 0.84% Native American, 0.21% Asian, 3.49% from other races, and 1.39% from two or more races. Hispanic or Latino of any race were 6.00% of the population.

There were 496 households, out of which 47.2% had children under the age of 18 living with them, 60.3% were married couples living together, 11.7% had a female householder with no husband present, and 23.2% were non-families. 16.9% of all households were made up of individuals, and 4.0% had someone living alone who was 65 years of age or older. The average household size was 2.89 and the average family size was 3.27.

The population breakdown was 33.3% under the age of 18, 9.7% from 18 to 24, 36.5% from 25 to 44, 16.4% from 45 to 64, and 4.2% who were 65 years of age or older. The median age was 30 years. For every 100 females, there were 105.4 males. For every 100 females age 18 and over, there were 99.8 males.

The median income for a household in the town was $49,596, and the median income for a family was $51,902. Males had a median income of $38,875 versus $25,066 for females. The per capita income for the town was $18,902. About 7.8% of families and 9.2% of the population were below the poverty line, including 11.8% of those under age 18 and 9.5% of those age 65 or over.

Media
Elizabeth is home to the weekly newspaper the Meadowlark Herald, which is also the only newspaper wholly owned and published in Elbert County. The Elbert County News, The Ranchland News, The West Elbert County Sun, and The Prairie Times also publish Elbert County news and distribute widely in the county.

See also

 List of municipalities in Colorado

References

External links

 
 CDOT map of the Town of Elizabeth
 Elizabeth Celtic Festival

Towns in Elbert County, Colorado
Towns in Colorado
Denver metropolitan area